The keeled slider (Lerista planiventralis)  is a species of skink found in Western Australia.

References

Lerista
Reptiles described in 1902
Taxa named by Arthur Henry Shakespeare Lucas
Taxa named by Charles Frost (naturalist)